The International Waterski & Wakeboard Federation (IWWF) is the world governing body for all towed water sports. Founded in Geneva, Switzerland in 1946, it is recognized by the International Olympic Committee (IOC) as the sole authority governing all towed water sports  and has 91 affiliated member federations worldwide. The IWWF is also an affiliate member of the Global Association of International Sports Federations (GAISF) and is one of the seven founding sports of the World Games.

The IWWF’s competitive and recreational towed water sports divisions include the following: Tournament (3-Event Waterskiing), Wakeboard, Barefoot, Show Skiing, Cable Wakeboard, Cableski, Ski Racing, and Disabled Skiing.

Functions of the IWWF:

 Promotes and develops towed water sports worldwide through National Federations
 Develops technical rules for all towed water sport disciplines
 Organizes educational and training programs for technical officials and coaches
 Provides resources for federations for athlete and technical official development and education
 Represents federations and athletes as and when needed
 Manages towed water sport disciplines at Multi-Sport Games recognized by the IOC and its Regional Olympic Councils (World Games, Pan Am Games, Mediterranean Games, South East Asian Games, Asian Beach Games, South American Games, etc.)
 Secures hosts for and manages IWWF World Titled events – a total of 11 events biennially
 Secures hosts for and manages IWWF World Cup stops – 46 stops held and a total of $5.7 million in cash prizes disbursed to athletes since 2004
 Lobbies for inclusion in regional Multi-Sport, Youth, and Olympic Games
 Complies with the World Anti-Doping Code and supports a clean sport
 Seeks sponsorships

The current President of the IWWF is Jose Antonio Perez Priego from Mexico.

National federations 
 Federación Mexicana de Esqui Acuatico
 Federaçao Portuguesa de Ski Náutico
 Australian Waterski and Wakeboard Federation
 Costa Rica WaterSki Association
 Chinese Taipei Water-Ski Association
 Federación Colombaina de Esqui Nautico
 Turkish Underwater Sports Federation
 Czech Waterski Federation
 Waterski Federation of Belarus
 Belgian Wakekeboard Association
 Federation Francophone de ski nautique et de wakeboard
 Federación Mexicana de Ski Acuático
 Hungarian Waterski and Wakeboard Federation
 Finnish Water Ski Sports
 Victorian Water Ski Association
 Polish Motorboat and Waterski Federation
 Swedish Waterski Federation
 Federació Catalana d'Esquí Nàutic
 Federación Española de Esquí Náutico y Wakeboard
 French Wakeboard Association (Association Française de Wakeboard (AFW)
 Slovak Water Ski Federation
 Brazilian Water Ski Confederation
 Dutch Waterski Federation (Nederlandse Waterski Bond, NWB)
 Norwegian Waterski & Wakeboard Federation
 Queensland Tournament Waterski Association
 French waterski federation (Fédération Française de Ski Nautique, FFSN)
 Brazilian Water Ski Confederation
 Singapore Water Ski Federation
 Austrian Waterski Federation (Oesterreichischer Wasserskiverband, OEWSV)
 Danish Water Ski Federation
 Finnish Water Ski Sports
 Japan Water Ski Association
 IWSF Region Europe, Africa and Middle East
 Swiss Water Ski Federation
 Korea Water Ski Association
 National Collegiate Water Ski Association (USA, Div. of USAWS)
 Italian Waterski Federation
 Hong Kong Water Ski Association
 United Arab Emirates Water Ski Federation
 Austrian Water Ski Federation
 South African Water Ski Federation
 British Water Ski
 Finnish Water Ski Sports
 Water Ski and Wakeboard Canada / Ski Nautique et Planche Canada
 USA Water Ski
 German Waterski Federation
 Croatian Waterski Federation (Hrvatski Savez za skijanje na vodi)
 Danish Water Ski
 Bulgarian Water Ski Federation

See also

Association of IOC Recognised International Sports Federations

References

External links 
 Europe & Africa Cable Wakeboard Council (ECWC)
 Cable Wakeboard World Council (CWWC)
 Cable Development Committee (ICDC) 

International sports bodies based in Switzerland
Waterski
Wakeboarding
Waterskiing
Zug